Aethionema grandiflorum, commonly known as Persian stonecress or Persian candytuft, is a flowering plant in the family Brassicaceae, preferring to grow at 750 to 2600m on limestone slopes. It is sometimes kept as a garden plant, and occasionally naturalizes outside its original range of eastern Turkey, the southern Caucasus and northern Iran. It is a recipient of the RHS's Award of Garden Merit.

Description
Aethionema grandiflorum is a many-stemmed, short-lived perennial, typically forming 15 to 30cm (at most 40cm) tall spreading mounds. Its foliage is evergreen, and it has up to 15 pink to lilac cruciform flowers borne on terminal racemes. It prefers alkaline soils.

References

grandiflorum
Garden plants of Asia
Groundcovers
Flora of the Transcaucasus
Flora of Western Asia
Plants described in 1849
Taxa named by Pierre Edmond Boissier
Taxa named by Rudolph Friedrich Hohenacker